The Evergreen School District is a school district based in the Evergreen district of San Jose, California. It operates fifteen elementary schools (K-6) and three middle schools (7-8). The district has 564 teachers (FTEs) serving 12,621 students.

Schools

Notes: Partiality based on 2002–2003 school year data

References

External links
 

School districts in San Jose, California